Because Chile extends from a point about 625 kilometers north of the Tropic of Capricorn to a point hardly more than 1,400 kilometers north of the Antarctic Circle, within its territory can be found a broad selection of the Earth's climates.

In 1950, CORFO defined, following criteria of geographic and economic homogeneity, six regions in continental Chile: Norte Grande, Norte Chico, Núcleo Central, Concepción y La Frontera, Los Lagos and Los Canales.

Although this territorial division was never used to define administrative entities (as the current Regions of Chile), the natural regions continue to be used for reference purposes.

Overview
These natural regions are ordered from north to south and reduced to five natural regions: Each has its own characteristic vegetation, fauna, climate, and, despite the omnipresence of both the Andes and the Pacific, its own distinct topography.

Norte Grande

Most of the region is covered by the Atacama Desert and has a dry arid climate. The coast range has peaks over 2000 m and ends in cliffs in the coast. There are large salt flats in the Intermediate depression and the Andes. Norte Grande has Chile's highest mountains including Ojos del Salado (6,891 m) but host also the Altiplano and puna high plateaus.

Norte Chico

The region has semi-arid climate, characterized by the transition from the Atacama Desert to the Mediterranean Matorral vegetation. The coast range and the Andes merges in this zone leaving no space for the Intermediate depression which is "replaced" by several transversal (east-west) valleys. The lack of an intermediate depression and absence of volcanic activity are believed to be the result of the flat-slab subduction of the Juan Fernández Ridge.

Zona Central

Mediterranean climate, vegetation of the Chilean Matorral.  The Intermediate Depression of central Chile extends from Santiago to the south as a fertile region and is considered the agricultural heartland of Chile.  After the Destruction of Seven Cities (1598–1604), all major settlements within the colonial Captaincy General of Chile came to be confined in central Chile, excepting only La Serena and the Chiloé Archipelago.

Zona Sur

Temperate oceanic climate, vegetation of Valdivian temperate rain forests. The coast range is lower than further north with no peak over 1,500 m. The Intermediate depression is close to sea level. There are features from the last glacial maximum in the Andes and the Intermediate depression such as moraines and glacial lakes. Intensive volcanism in the Andes in form of volcanoes and hot springs.

Zona Austral

Covers all of Chilean Patagonia, and the Chiloé Archipelago. Zona austral has a subpolar oceanic climate and a vegetation of Magellanic subpolar forests in the west and Patagonian grasslands in the east. The former Patagonian Ice Sheet have eroded the coast range so that it now of islands and is not present south of Taitao Peninsula. The Intermediate depression is under the sea level. Fjords penetrate the Andes where there are also two ice sheets and several glacial lakes.

See also
Climate of Chile
Geography of Chile
Geology of Chile

Notes 

 
Natural history of Chile
Subdivisions of Chile